The Federal Home Loan Banks (FHLBanks, or FHLBank System) are 11 U.S. government-sponsored banks that provide liquidity to the members of financial institutions to support housing finance and community investment.

Overview
The FHLBank System was chartered by Congress in 1932, during the Great Depression. It has a primary mission of providing member financial institutions with financial products/services which assist and enhance the financing of housing and community lending. The 11 FHLBanks are each structured as cooperatives owned and governed by their member financial institutions, which today include savings and loan associations (thrifts), commercial banks, credit unions and insurance companies. Each FHLBank is required to register at least one class of equity with the SEC, although their debt is not registered.

A benefit of FHLBank membership is access to liquidity through secured loans, known as advances, which are funded by the FHLBanks in the capital markets from the issuance of discount notes or term debt, collectively known as consolidated obligations (COs). COs are joint and several obligations of all the FHLBanks, i.e., any debt issued on behalf of one FHLBank is the responsibility of all for repayment, with the issuing FHLBank having the primary responsibility. The Office of Finance (OF) serves as the fiscal agent for the FHLBanks, with responsibility for offering, issuing and servicing COs, as well as preparing the combined financial reports. Although the individual FHLBanks are SEC registrants, the FHLBank System is not. Thus, the FHLBank System financial reports are “combined” rather than “consolidated.”

Ownership
The 11 banks of the FHLBank System are owned by over 7,300 regulated financial institutions from all 50 states, U.S. possessions, and territories. Equity in the FHLBanks is held by these owner/members and is not publicly traded. Institutions must purchase stock in order to become a member. In return, members obtain access to funding, and also receive dividends based on their stock ownership. The FHLBanks are self-capitalizing in that as members seek to increase their borrowing, they must first purchase additional stock to support the activity. FHLBanks are exempt from corporate federal, state, and local taxation, except for local real estate tax. The capital investments in FHLBanks receive preferential risk-weighting exemption treatment from the Basel II rules (which would normally require non-traded equity investments to be risk-weighted at 400%, but the exemption allows only 100%). The FHLBanks pay an assessment of 10% of annual earnings for affordable housing programs. The mission of the FHLBanks reflects a public purpose (increase access to housing and aid communities by extending credit to member financial institutions), but all 11 are privately capitalized and, apart from the tax privileges, do not receive taxpayer assistance.

Financial results and condition
Since August 2006, all 11 banks have been registered with the United States Securities and Exchange Commission and all financial statements and other filings are available to the public at the SEC web site (EDGAR).

On August 5, 2011, the Federal Housing Finance Agency announced that the FHLBanks had satisfied their obligation to make payments related to the Resolution Funding Corporation (RefCorp) bonds. The Banks were required to pay 20 percent of their net income (after payments to the Affordable Housing Program) toward the RefCorp bond payments. Each Bank now pays 20% of its net income into its own separate restricted retained earnings account until the account equals one percent of that Bank's outstanding consolidated obligations.

At December 31, 2014, each of the FHLBanks was in compliance with its statutory minimum capital requirements and the FHLBank System as a whole was above its minimum capital requirements.

On March 27, 2015, the FHLBanks Office of Finance published the 2014 Combined Financial Report. For 2014, the FHLBanks recorded net income of $2,245 million. Combined assets of the FHLBanks were $913.3 billion as of December 31, 2014. Of this total, advances equaled $571 billion. Investments were the second largest component at $267 billion. Mortgage loans held for portfolio were $44 billion. The FHLBanks made affordable housing contributions of $269 million in 2014.

The principal assets of the FHLBanks are advances (secured loans to members), mortgage loans held for portfolio, and other investments. The FHLBanks are required by regulation to hold collateral in excess of the actual loan amount for any given borrower. The FHLBanks are funded through the daily sale of debt securities in the global capital markets. All 11 FHLBanks are jointly and severally liable for the liabilities of each individual FHLBank.

History
As a result of the Great Depression the FHLBanks were established by the Federal Home Loan Bank Board (FHLBB) pursuant to the Federal Home Loan Bank Act of 1932. This was in order to provide funds to "building and loan" institutions, providing liquidity and making mortgages available.

Initially, the FHLBanks made direct loans to home owners, but transferred this responsibility to the Home Owners' Loan Corporation when it was created the following year.

As a result of the savings and loan crisis of the 1980s the Financial Institutions Reform, Recovery and Enforcement Act of 1989 (FIRREA) abolished the FHLBB and transferred oversight responsibility of the FHLBanks to the Federal Housing Finance Board (FHFB) and regulatory responsibility to the Office of Thrift Supervision (OTS) in the Department of the Treasury. FIRREA also allowed all federally insured depository institutions to join the FHLBank System, including commercial banks and credit unions.

As a result of the late-2000s financial crisis the Housing and Economic Recovery Act of 2008 (HERA) replaced the FHFB with the Federal Housing Finance Agency (FHFA). The Secretary of the Treasury was authorized to purchase FHLBank debt securities in any amount through December 31, 2009, after which the limit would return to the original $4 billion. On September 7, 2008, the U.S. Treasury announced a new credit facility for the three housing government-sponsored enterprises. This enabled the Secretary of the Treasury to purchase FHLBank debt in any amount subject to the pledging of advances and other assets as collateral. The authority for this facility expired on December 31, 2009.

As a result of the late-2000s recession, section 312 of the Dodd-Frank Wall Street Reform and Consumer Protection Act mandated merger of OTS with the Office of the Comptroller of the Currency (OCC), the Federal Deposit Insurance Corporation (FDIC), the Federal Reserve Board of Governors, and the Consumer Financial Protection Bureau (CFPB) as of July 21, 2011.

Related legislation
 To amend the Federal Home Loan Bank Act to authorize privately insured credit unions to become members of a Federal home loan bank (H.R. 3584; 113th Congress) - a bill that would amend the Federal Home Loan Bank Act to treat certain privately insured credit unions as insured depository institutions for purposes of determining eligibility for membership in a federal home loan bank. This change would make such credit unions "eligible for membership in the Federal Home Loan Bank System."

See also

 Farm Credit System
 Government-sponsored enterprise

References

Further reading
 For a list of articles discussing the Federal Home Loan Bank System, Fannie Mae, and Freddie Mac, see Fannie Mae and Freddie Mac: A Bibliography.
 Susan M. Hoffman and Mark K. Cassell, eds. Mission Expansion in the Federal Home Loan Bank System (State University of New York Press; 2010) 208 pages
 Thomson, James B. and Matthew Koepke. "Federal Home Loan Banks: The Housing GSE That Didn’t Bark in the Night?," Economic Trends 09.23.10 (Federal Reserve Bank of Cleveland) online

External links
Council of FHLBanks
FHLBanks Office of Finance
Federal Housing Finance Agency
SEC filings from the FHLBanks

Banks
Federal Home Loan Bank of Atlanta
Federal Home Loan Bank of Boston
Federal Home Loan Bank of Chicago
Federal Home Loan Bank of Cincinnati
Federal Home Loan Bank of Dallas
Federal Home Loan Bank of Des Moines
Federal Home Loan Bank of Indianapolis
Federal Home Loan Bank of New York
Federal Home Loan Bank of Pittsburgh
Federal Home Loan Bank of San Francisco
Federal Home Loan Bank of Topeka

FHLB
Mortgage industry of the United States